Athirasam Tamil old name Amutharasam or Athiraha (() means extremely tasty) is a sweet in Sri Lankan cuisine. It is a sweet-cake of jaggery and rice flour made into a paste flattened into circles and fried. Athirasa is also famous in India for Diwali. Athirasa is served on festive occasions along with other sweets such as Kavum, Kokis, and Aluwa.

References

External links
Recipe and photo

Sri Lankan desserts and sweets
Sinhalese New Year foods